Meeting Creek is a hamlet in central Alberta, Canada within Camrose County, located  west of Highway 56, approximately  south of Camrose.

Demographics 

See also 
List of communities in Alberta
List of designated places in Alberta
List of hamlets in Alberta

References 

Camrose County
Hamlets in Alberta
Designated places in Alberta